Gliomatosis cerebri is a rare primary diffuse  brain tumor that has a poor prognosis. It is defined by the World Health Organization as a diffusely infiltrating glial tumor impacting at least three cerebral lobes, mostly with bilateral involvement of the cerebral hemispheres and/or deep gray matter. These malignancies consist of infiltrative threads  that spread quickly and deeply into the surrounding brain tissue, or into multiple parts of the brain simultaneously, making them very difficult to remove with surgery or treat with radiation. It is distinguished histopathologically by the infiltration of malignant astrocytic components into the surrounding neuropil. Gliomatosis cerebri behaves like a malignant tumor that is very similar to glioblastoma. 

While gliomatosis cerebri can occur at any age, it is most commonly found between the ages of 46 and 53. It is slightly more common in men than in women.

Signs and symptoms
It may affect any part of the brain or even the spinal cord, optic nerve and compact white matter. Clinical manifestations are indefinite, and include headache, seizures, visual disturbances, corticospinal tract deficits, lethargy, and dementia. A case of gliomatosis cerebri presenting as rapidly progressive dementia and Parkinson's disease like symptoms has been described in an 82-year-old woman.

Diagnosis

Before the advent of MRI, diagnosis was generally not established until autopsy. Even with MRI, however, diagnosis is difficult. Typically, gliomatosis cerebri appears as a diffuse, poorly circumscribed, infiltrating non-enhancing lesion that is hyperintense on T2-weighted images and expands the cerebral white matter. It is difficult to distinguish from highly infiltrative anaplastic astrocytoma or GBM.

Registry

In 2014, Weill Cornell Brain and Spine Center launched an international registry for gliomatosis cerebri, where tissue samples can be stored for genomic study.

Notes

External links 

Brain tumor